In film, Afrofuturism is the incorporation of black people's history and culture in science fiction film and related genres. The Guardians Ashley Clark said the term Afrofuturism has "an amorphous nature" but that Afrofuturist films are "united by one key theme: the centering of the international black experience in alternate and imagined realities, whether fiction or documentary; past or present; science fiction or straight drama". The New York Timess Glenn Kenny said, "Afrofuturism is more prominent in music and the graphic arts than it is in cinema, but there are movies out there that illuminate the notion in different ways."

The 2018 film Black Panther was a major box-office success and contributed to Afrofuturism becoming more mainstream.

List of films

References

 
Lists of science fiction films